Good Hope Methodist Church Cemetery is a historic church cemetery located near Welcome, Davidson County, North Carolina.   It is associated with the Good Hope Methodist Church, founded about 1836. It contains approximately 350 burials, with the earliest gravestone dated to 1834.   It features a unique collection of folk gravestones by local stonecutters erected in Davidson County in the late-18th and first half of the 19th centuries.

It was listed on the National Register of Historic Places in 1984.

References

Methodist cemeteries
Cemeteries on the National Register of Historic Places in North Carolina
Cemeteries in Davidson County, North Carolina
National Register of Historic Places in Davidson County, North Carolina